The 1936 Auburn Tigers football team represented Auburn University in the 1936 college football season. The Tigers' were led by head coach Jack Meagher in his third season and finished the season with a record of seven wins, two losses and two ties (7–2–2 overall, 4–1–1 in the SEC). Auburn also tied Villanova in the Bacardi Bowl, the first bowl game in the history of the Tigers' program.

Schedule

References

Auburn
Auburn Tigers football seasons
Auburn Tigers football